The Pobjoy Niagara is a British seven-cylinder, air-cooled, radial, aero-engine first produced in 1934. The design ran at higher speeds than conventional engines, and used reduction gearing to lower the speed of the propeller. This led to a noticeable off-centre mounting for the propeller. The Niagara was a popular engine for light and experimental aircraft, well regarded due to its small diameter, smooth operation, low noise and innovative engineering.

Variants
Niagara I
Bore/stroke 77 x 87 mm (3.03 x 3.43 in), swept volume 2,835 cc (173 cu in). Compression 6.25:1, gearing 0.47:1. Normal continuous power 84 hp (63 kW) at 3,200 rpm at sea level.

Niagara II
Bore/stroke 77 x 87 mm (3.03x3.43 in), swept volume 2,835 cc (173 cu in). Compression 6.0:1, gearing 0.39:1. Normal continuous power 84 hp (63 kW) at 3,200 rpm at sea level.

Niagara III
Bore/stroke 77 x 87 mm  (3.03x3.43 in), swept volume 2,835 cc (173 cu in). Gearing 0.47:1. Normal continuous power 88 hp (66 kW) at 3,300 rpm at sea level.

Niagara IV
Similar to Niagara III but with a higher operating rpm. Normal continuous power 98 hp (73 kW) at 3,500 rpm at sea level.

Niagara V
Larger version of the basic Niagara. Bore/stroke 81 x 87 mm (3.19 x 3.43 in), swept volume 3,138 cc (191.5 cu in). Compression 8.0:1, gearing 0.47:1. Normal continuous power 125 hp (93 kW) at 4,000 rpm at sea level.

Cataract I-III
De-rated, uncowled versions of Niagara I-III with simple inter-cylinder baffles for cooling and trickle-down lubrication for lower exhaust rockers. Compression 5.7:1, gearing 0.47:1.

Cascade
Direct drive version of Cataract I.  Normal continuous power 66 hp (49 kW) at 2,100 rpm.

Applications

Niagara
 Aeroput MMS-3
 Airspeed Fleet Shadower
 CLW Curlew
 Comper Kite
 Comper Swift
 General Aircraft Monospar ST-25
 General Aircraft Fleet Shadower
 Gribovsky G-25
 Lambach HL.I 
 Moss M.A.1
 Pobjoy Pirate
 Saro Shrimp
 Shapley Kittiwake
 Short Scion Senior
 Short Scion
 Short S.31 (half scale Stirling)
 Spartan Clipper
 Westland CL.20

Cataract
 British Klemm Swallow
 Hafner A.R.III Gyroplane
 Hendy Hobo
 Pitcairn PA-22

Cascade
 Autogiro AC-35

Survivors
A Pobjoy Niagara powered Comper Swift G-ACTF that is owned and operated by The Shuttleworth Collection, Old Warden remains airworthy in 2017 and displays to the public at home airshows during the flying season.

Engines on display
A preserved Pobjoy Niagara engine is on public display at the Science Museum (London).

Specifications (Pobjoy Niagara IV)

See also

References

Notes

Bibliography

 Gunston, Bill. World Encyclopedia of Aero Engines. Cambridge, England. Patrick Stephens Limited, 1989. 
 Lumsden, Alec. British Piston Engines and their Aircraft. Marlborough, Wiltshire: Airlife Publishing, 2003. .

External links

 Pobjoy Niagara at oldengine.org
"A New Pobjoy Engine" - article in Flight

Niagara
1930s aircraft piston engines
Aircraft air-cooled radial piston engines